Dikotsi Lekopa (born 7 July 1988) is a South African athlete specialising in the 3000 metres steeplechase. He competed at the 2015 World Championships in Beijing narrowly missing the final.

His personal best in the event is 8:32.17 set in Stellenbosch in 2015.

Competition record

References

External links

1988 births
Living people
South African male steeplechase runners
World Athletics Championships athletes for South Africa
Place of birth missing (living people)
South African Athletics Championships winners